Borrelia carolinensis is a spirochete bacterium associated with Lyme disease.

References

External links 
NCBI Taxonomy Browser - Borrelia

LPSN

carolinensis
Bacteria described in 2011